The Vilna Rabbinical School and Teachers' Seminary was a controversial Russian state-sponsored institution to train Jewish teachers and rabbis, located in Vilna, Russian Empire. The school opened in 1847 with two divisions: a rabbinical school and a teachers' seminary. The Rabbinical School was closed in 1873 and the Teachers' Seminary closed in 1914. The school taught secular studies, unlike the traditional cheders and yeshivas. This new curriculum, as well as the government control, made the school "unpopular."

Curriculum 
The school taught German language, Hebrew language, Hebrew Bible, Talmud, algebra, geometry, trigonometry, physics, astronomy, world history, Russian history, Russian language, geography, and handwriting and drawing.

History 
Rabbi Yisroel Salanter, a major figure of the Mussar movement who then lived in Vilna, was pressured to lead the seminary. Rather than accept the position, Salanter fled to Kovno, even though Rabbi Yitzhak of Volozhin encouraged him to take the position.

In 1872, a secret Narodnik study group was formed by Aaron Zundelevich. Vladimir Jochelson was a member of this group.

Faculty and students 
Many prominent maskilim studied or taught in the school.

Notable faculty included:
Leibele Antokolier (a.k.a. Arieh-Leib b. Akiba Luria, "The Keidan Genius")
Shmuel Yosef Feunn (author, maskil, and educator)
Aaron Samuel Liebermann
Solomon Salkind (1806 – March 14, 1868), author of Shirim li-Shelomoh, Kol Shelomoh, and Shema Shelomoh.

Notable students included:
Vladimir Jochelson, Russian ethnographer

Weblinks 
Vilna Rabbinical School and Teachers' Seminary  1847-1873 The Edward Blank YIVO Vilna Online Collections Original documents (Russian) on vilnacollections.yivo.org

References

External links
The Jews of Vilna at the Beginning of the 20th Century on the Yad Vashem website

Defunct schools in Vilnius
Jewish seminaries
Orthodox Jewish educational institutions
 
Haskalah
Judaism-related controversies
Jews and Judaism in the Russian Empire
Judaism in Vilnius
Educational institutions established in 1847
Educational institutions disestablished in 1914
1847 establishments in the Russian Empire